Central and Western Democratic Power is a local political group in the Central and Western district of Hong Kong. It was convened by Kam Nai Wai, a member of Democratic Party and Central and Western District Councillor, and is mainly composed of pro-democracy District Councillors of the district.

Its platform includes striving for general election of the Chief Executive in 2007 and Legislative Council in 2008, public consultation of implementation of Article 23 of the Basic Law by means of a White Bill, stopping reclamation to protect the Victoria Harbour, cutting transportation fares for elderly citizens, and other local affairs.

8 out of 10 members of the group won in the 2003 District Council elections in the Central and Western district.

External links
Web page of C&W Democratic Power (Broken Link)
Politics of Hong Kong
Central and Western District, Hong Kong
Political parties in Hong Kong